Anna Bahriana or Ваhryana (born March 24, 1981) is a Ukrainian novelist, poet, playwright, and translator.

Biography
Bahriana was born on March 24, 1981 in the city of Fastiv, Kyiv Oblast. She graduated from the Language Institute of Taras Shevchenko National University of Kyiv in Ukrainian language and literature. Following this, she worked as a radio and television journalist. Currently, she is a member of the National Writer's Union of Ukraine, the Association of Ukrainian Writers, and the Slavic Academy of Literature and the Arts (Bulgaria).

Bahriana has published seven books of poetry, two collections of plays and three novels: "The Etymology of Blood" (Kyiv, 2008), "Such a Strange Love This is" (Kyiv 2010), and "The Pesterer" (Kyiv, 2012). She has also compiled and translated an anthology of contemporary poetry from the North Macedonia. Her novel, "Such a Strange Love This is" was translated into Macedonian. Her collection of dramatic pieces, "Plays," has been translated into Macedonian and Serbian (Štip, North Macedonia, 2011; Smederevo, Serbia, 2012).

Books

Ukraine 
Poems:
 The floscule of words. (Суцвіття слів). Poems. – Kyiv.: Prosvita. – 2000. – 94 p. .
 Among lilac dreams. (Поміж бузкових снів). Poems. – Kyiv.: JUANA. – 2002. – 124 p. .
 Between gods and us. (Між богами і нами). Poems. – Kyiv.: JUANA. – 2005. – 116 p. .
 Walking a tightrope (Мандрівка линвою / Spacer po linie). Poems, translations. In Ukrainian and Poland. In collaboration whis Voicheh Pestka. Lviv-Radom: Kamenyar. – 2008. – 94 p. .
 Other lines. (Інші лінії). Poems. – Kyiv.: Prosvita. – 2009. – 200 p. .
 The spell of love. (Замовляння із любові). Poems. – Luck.: Tverdynia. – 2011. – 84 p. .

Prose:
 The Etymology of Blood (Етимологія крові). Novel. – Kyiv.: Fact.– 2008. – 156 p. .
 Anna Bahriana about Maria Zankovetska, Olena Teliha, Vanga, Maria Prymachenko, Slava Stetsko: stories. For Children. (Анна Багряна про Марію Заньковецьку, Олену Телігу, Вангу, Марію Примаченко, Славу Стецько). – Kyiv.: Grani-T., 2010. – 96 p. (series "Living outstanding children"). .
 Such a Strange Love This is. (Дивна така любов). Novel-sonata. – Kyiv.: Nora-druk. - 2010. – 208 p. (series "Popular Books"). .
 The Pesterer. (Дошкуляка). Novel. – Kyiv.: Nora-druk. – 2012. – 216 p. (series "Popular Books"). .

Translations:
 Risto Vasilevski. The Temple and the Temple still (Храм, справді, храм). Poems. Compiler and translator from Macedonian: Anna Bahriana. – Luck.: Tverdynia. – 2011. – 148 p. (series "Modern Balkan poetry"). .
 Dimitar Hristov. Across the border. (Крізь кордони). Poems. Compiler and translator from Bulgarian: Anna Bahriana. – Luck.: Tverdynia. – 2012. – 64 p. (series "Modern Balkan poetry"). .
 Jeton Kelmendi. On the top of the time. (На верхів’ї часу). Poems. Compiler and translator from Albanian: Anna Bahriana. – Luck.: Tverdynia. – 2012. – 40 p. (series "Modern Balkan poetry"). .

Performances of plays and libretti:

 "Beyond Time" (dramatic poem) at the ERA Drama Theater (Kyiv) in 2006 and the Premiera Music & Drama Studio (Kyiv) in 2009
 "Gloria" (a musical) at the Donetsk National Ukrainian Academic Theater of Music and Drama, 2010
 "Rhododendron" (a tragicomedy in two acts) at the Homin Ukrainian Drama Theater (Chicago) in 2010

Poland 
Poems:
 Create me in your dreams... (Wysnij mnie...). Translator from Ukrainian: Voicheh Pestka. – Częstochowa.: Leterackie Towarzystwo Wzaimniej Adoracji "Li-TWA". – 2008. – 39 p. .

Azerbaijan 
Poems:
 Two grains of sand (IKI ỌUM DƏNƏS). – Translators from Ukrainian: Elchin Iskenderzade, Arzu Huseinova. – Baku.: "Vektor" Nәşrlәr Evi. – 2009. – 72 p.

Bulgaria 
Poems:
 The anchor for two (Котва за двама). Translator from Ukrainian: Dimitar Hristov. – Varna.: Slavic literary and artistic Academy. – 2011. – 80 p. .

Translations:
 Two Bahriana's in Eternal and Holy (Двете Багряни във ВЕЧНАТА И СВЯТАТА). (bilingual Bulgarian-Ukrainian edition of poems of Elisaveta Bahriana, compiler and translator from Bulgarian: Anna Bahriana). – Varna.: Slavic literary and artistic Academy. – 2009. – 112 p. .
 Dora Gabe. Sun, wait! (Сонце, почекай! / Почакай, слънце!). (Bilingual Bulgarian-Ukrainian edition, compiler and translator from Bulgarian: Anna Bahriana). – Varna.: Slavic literary and artistic Academy. – 2012. – 112 p. .

North Macedonia 
Dramaturgy:
 Plays. (Пиеси). Translators from Ukrainian: Dimitar Hristov, Vasil Mihailov, Ilia Arev, Trajche Kacarov. – Shtip. – 2011. – 120 p. .

Prose:
 Such a Strange Love This is. (Толку необична љубов). Novel-sonata. Translator from Ukrainian: Vera Chornyi-Meshkova. – Skopje.: MATICA. – 2011. – 118 p. .

Poems:
 The tabouret. (Ѓерѓеф). Translator from Ukrainian: Vesna Acevska, Vera Chornyi-Meshkova. – Kochani. – 2012. – 48 p. .

Translations:
 Modern Poetry of Republic of Macedonia. Anthology. Compiler and translator from Macedonian: Anna Bahriana. – Skopje. – Feniks. – 2012. – 160 p. (Series "Aura"). .

Serbia 
Dramaturgy:
 Plays (Комади). Translator from Ukrainian: Risto Vasilevski. – Smederevo.: Arka. – 2012. – 127 p. (Series "Scene"). .

Poems:
 The Scythian woman (Скитска дева / Скіфська діва). Translator from Ukrainian: Vera Horvat. – Smederevo: Smederovo's Poet Autumn. – Meridijani. – 2012. – 80 p. .

Belgium 
Poems:
 The anchor (L'Ancre): Poems / Translator from Ukrainian: Dmytro Tchystiak. - Brussels: L'Esprit des Aigles, 2012, 40 p. .

Honors, awards and prizes 
 The Ukrainian-German International Honchar Prize, 3rd place in the 2008 Crowning the Word competition, and 2nd Prize in the 2008 Smoloskyp Competition for her novel, "The Etymology of Blood."
 The 2009 "Silver Flying Pen" International Award Literary (Bulgaria) for her translation of a book of poetry by Elizaveta Bagriana.
 Winner of the 2009 Marusia Beck Literary Prize (WFUWO, Canada) for her short story, "Green Borshch."
 The Award of International Mediterranean Academy (R.Macedonia, 2012).
 The "Qiriu i Naimit" International Award Literary (R.Macedonia – R.Kosovo, 2012) for specific values of poetry.

References

1981 births
Living people
People from Kyiv Oblast
Ukrainian women poets
Ukrainian translators
Ukrainian women novelists
21st-century Ukrainian poets
21st-century Ukrainian women writers
21st-century translators